Azizabad (also Romanized as ʿAzīzābād) is a village in Ab Bar Rural District, in the Central District of Tarom County, Zanjan Province, Iran. At the 2006 census, its population was 105, in 22 families.

References 

Populated places in Tarom County